Sabine Karsenti is a French Canadian actress. Karsenti has played in both film and television, in French and in English from Montreal to Los Angeles.

Career
On the big screen, Karsenti has been in the role of Chrissie in Battlefield Earth. She also held several other leading roles, including The Favorite Game, Musketeers Forever and Bonjour Timothy, shot in New Zealand. Karsenti has had smaller roles in feature films such as Cadavre Exquis première édition, presented at the World Film Festival of Montreal in 2006. She was also part of the distribution of American films Time Bomb and The Perfect Marriage.

On the small screen, Karsenti starred in the series The Crow: Stairway to Heaven in which she played Shelly Webster.

Personal life
Karsenti graduated from the Lee Strasberg Theatre and Film Institute and the Stella Adler Studio of Acting.

Filmography

Film

Television

References

External links 
 

Year of birth missing (living people)
Canadian people of French descent
Actresses from Montreal
Canadian film actresses
Canadian television actresses
Stella Adler Studio of Acting alumni
Lee Strasberg Theatre and Film Institute alumni
Living people
20th-century Canadian actresses
21st-century Canadian actresses